Events in the year 2018 in Guinea.

Incumbents
President: Alpha Condé
Prime Minister: Mamady Youla (until 24 May); Ibrahima Kassory Fofana (from 24 May)

Events

24 May – Ibrahima Kassory Fofana takes over as Prime Minister of Guinea

September – scheduled date for the Guinean legislative election, 2018

Deaths

4 January – Papa Camara, footballer (b. 1951).

References

 
2010s in Guinea 
Years of the 21st century in Guinea 
Guinea 
Guinea